Sahib Kaur (d.1841) was the second wife of Nau Nihal Singh, third Maharaja of the Sikh Empire and the mother of his son, Jawahar Singh.

Biography 
Kaur was born to Sardar Gurdit Singh Gilwaliwala of Amritsar. She became the second wife of Nau Nihal Singh who was second in line of succession to the throne of Punjab after his father, Kharak Singh. He was the only son of Maharaja Kharak Singh and his queen consort, Maharani Chand Kaur and grandson of the legendary Maharaja Ranjit Singh and his queen consort, Maharani Datar Kaur of the Nakai Misl.

After the accession of Kharak Singh as the Maharaja, Kunwar Nau Nihal Singh became the Yuvraj (Crown Prince). 

It was decided to kill of Chet Singh Bajwa and to divest the Maharaja of all powers and to entrust Sri Tikka Kanwar Naunihal Singh with the responsibility of running the administration. From October 8, 1839 Kharak Singh was deprived of all his administrative powers, and all authority passed to Nau Nihal Singh. Thus beginning his reign. Kharak Singh died on November 5, 1940 and Nau Nihal Singh met a fatal accident on the very day of his father's cremation and died. Hazuri Bagh Gateway collapse still remains a mystery many think it was engineered by the Dogras or the British or the partisans of Chet Singh Bajwa. Dr Honigberger states that Nau Nihal Singh was alive when he was taken inside the fort by Dhian Singh Dogra. According to Alexander Gardner, who was just steps behind Nau Nihal when the incident took place, the prince had sustained only minor injuries during this episode: he was well enough to walk on his own, and agreed to be taken on a stretcher only because of Gardner's insistence. However, when the court physician Johann Martin Honigberger came to attend Nau Nihal in a tent, he observed that the prince's skull had been crushed, and the bedsheet was covered with blood and brain tissue. Dhian Singh insisted that the prince had suffered these injuries during the alleged accident in Hazuri Bagh. Nau Nihal died hours later, although the courtiers did not make this news public until three days later in an attempt to avoid panic. According to Gardner, five artillery men had carried Nau Nihal from Hazuri Bagh to the tent: two of these men died under mysterious circumstances, two went on leave and never re-joined the service, and one disappeared without explanation. Garder puts the blame on Dhian Singh and Honigberger too suggests that along with people who were loyal to Chet Singh Bajwa. Official court historian, Sohan Lal Suri labels it as a conspiracy of Sher Singh and Dhian Singh to claim the throne of the Punjab. 

After the deaths of Kharak Singh and Nau Nihal Singh, Maharani Chand Kaur took over the reins of power and claimed that since Sahib Kaur was pregnant her child would become the next ruler. On 2 December 1840 Chand Kaur was proclaimed Maharani of the Punjab, with the title Malika Muqaddasa (Empress Immaculate) and became the only female ruler the Sikh Empire. Sher Singh whose claim to the throne was supported by Dhian Singh Dogra left the capital after she gained complete control of the administration together with her supporters. But Sher Singh still had the support of the army and in 1841 he arrived in Lahore and secured a ceasefire. She was persuaded to accept a jagir and relinquish her claim to the throne and retired to her late son's palace in Lahore. Sahib Kaur gave birth to a stillborn son who was named Shahzada Jawahar Singh and passed away. This ended any justification for a renewed claim to the regency of Chand Kaur and she too was killed in 1842. 

Sohan Lal Suri notes with great horror about how Sher Singh secretly ordered for ‘hot medicines’ to be administered to Nau Nihal Singh’s widows, to ensure that they miscarried any pregnancies to ensure the throne from himself. Dr Honigberger claims that as a doctor he was always suspicious of the manner of the miscarriage of the baby boy of Sahib Kaur. Maharani Nanaki Kaur too was pregnant hence was also given medicines which resulted in a miscarriage.

Her Samadhi is located is the Royal Garden in between her mother-in-law, Chand Kaur's samadhi and her grandmother-in-law, Datar Kaur's samadhi lovingly called Mai Nakain by Maharaja Ranjit Singh.

References 

1841 deaths
Deaths in childbirth